Re Citro [1991] Ch 142 is an English land law and bankruptcy law case, concerning co-ownership of land, and an order for possession on bankruptcy of one co-owner.

Facts
Domenico and Carmine Citro went bankrupt and he had a solvent ex-wife. The remaining assets were a half share in their two family homes — Domenico had separated from his ex-wife and had his own house, co-owned with his new wife with three children, youngest 12 years old in Dryfield Road, Burnt Oak, Edgware of mid-to-high price in outer north-west London, being typical of private housing in London Borough of Barnet. Carmine continued to live with three children, youngest 10 at Bell Lane, Hendon, a similar value house in the same Borough. The debts owed exceeded the value of the bankrupts' interests (equity) in the homes. The trustees in bankruptcy applied for declarations and for orders for sale under the Law of Property Act 1925, section 30 (now replaced by the Trusts of Land and Appointment of Trustees Act 1996, section 14).

Judgment

High Court
Hoffmann J made orders for possession and sale but considering the circumstances of the two (successive) wives and their children, and because a half share left for the wives would not be enough to buy accommodation in his view reasonably nearby, and his assessment of finding equally good education in the area, he ordered the sales be postponed until each of the youngest children became 16.

Court of Appeal
Nourse LJ allowed the lenders’ appeal, whose interests would usually prevail. Financial hardship is not an exceptional circumstance. ‘Exceptional’ means beyond the normal ‘melancholy consequences’ of bankruptcy so hardship, eviction, relocation do not qualify as exceptional circumstances. The circumstances must be special, not just unusual.

Bingham LJ concurred, regretfully, because he said prior cases pointed this way and it was important to avoid arbitrariness. Still, he said submissions on a moratorium were to be invited.

Waller LJ dissented.

See also

Bankruptcy in the United Kingdom
English land law
English property law

References

1991 in England
1991 in case law
English trusts case law
English land case law
Court of Appeal (England and Wales) cases
1991 in British law